Donna Isabella Koraneliya ( Gajaman Nona) (10 March 1746-15 December 1815) was a Sri Lankan author who was noted for having the ability to write and recite impromptu Sinhala poetry.

Biography
She was born in Marawila, Ceylon as the second daughter of Don Francisco Senarathna Kumara Perumal and Francina Jasenthu Graivo. Gajaman was baptised as Donna Isabella Koraneliya at St. Paul's Church, Milagiriya in Bambalapitiya. As a baby, she was brought to Marawila in Beliatta as her father was undertaking Rājākariya, a system where the individual provides services in exchange for land. She had her early education within her own family. She was talented and earned her honorific name Gajaman Nona (Lady Gajaman) from her mother. She grew up in Matara, with a taste for dressing like a Dutch woman, which came from her partially 'Westernized' background. She had a surprising talent in literature, which was highlighted by the women of her community and status.

Her talents were noticed at an early age when someone hid her water pot, and she wrote this Sinhala poem:

Later in life, when married, Gajaman Nona was left almost destitute by the death of her husband. She couldn't get a proper job. As she had several children to take care of, she asked the then Fiscal Collector for the Matara district, D'Oyly, for some kind of assistance. D'Oyly granted her Nindagama (an area of land in which one is able to live and farm for one's own needs). In gratitude, she wrote poems with Sir D’Oyly. Today, a statue of her stands at Ambalantota, Nonagama Junction (the name derived from Gajaman Nona).

Further reading

References

1746 births
1815 deaths
Kandyan period
Sinhalese writers
People of the Kingdom of Kandy
Sri Lankan women poets
19th-century Sri Lankan writers
19th-century Sri Lankan women writers